The 2016–17 Serbian SuperLiga was the eleventh season of the Serbian SuperLiga since its establishment. Red Star are the defending champions. The fixtures were announced on 15 June 2016. Red Star Belgrade drew the highest average home attendance of the league (9,056).

Teams 
The league consisted of 16 teams: fourteen teams from the 2015–16 Serbian SuperLiga and two new teams from the 2015–16 Serbian First League. Napredak Kruševac, the 2015–16 First League champion, joined the top level two years after being relegated. Runners-up Bačka joined SuperLiga for the first time in history.

Stadiums and locations

Personnel and kits

Note: Flags indicate national team as has been defined under FIFA eligibility rules. Players and Managers may hold more than one non-FIFA nationality.

Nike, Inc. is the official ball supplier for Serbian SuperLiga.

Managerial changes

Transfers
For the list of transfers involving SuperLiga clubs during 2016–17 season, please see: List of Serbian football transfers summer 2016 and List of Serbian football transfers winter 2016–17.

Regular season

League table

Results
Each of the 16 competitors in the SuperLiga hosts every other team once in the regular season, for a total of 30 matches.

Play-offs

Championship round
The top eight teams advance from the regular season. Points from the regular season are halved with half points rounded up. Teams play each other once.

League table

Relegation round
The bottom eight teams from the regular season play in the relegation round. Points from the regular season are halved with half points rounded up. Teams play each other once.

League table

Individual statistics

Top goalscorers
As of matches played on 21 May 2017.

Hat-tricks

Player of the week

Awards

Team of the Season

Player of the season 
 Uroš Đurđević (Partizan)

Coach of the season
 Marko Nikolić (Partizan)

References

External links
 Official website
 uefa.com

Serbia
1
Serbian SuperLiga seasons